Kiyoshi Murota (born 26 July 1955) is a Japanese professional golfer.

Murota was born in Gunma Prefecture and attended the Nippon Sport Science University. After graduating, he became golf teaching instructor, and was well liked in Japan because of his easy, simple tips to help amateur golfers. While teaching, he would keep trying to become a touring professional. He obtained his Japan Golf Tour card after four tries at qualifying school after 1982.

Murota's first win on the Japan Golf Tour came in 1991 but his best season money wise was 1992, where he finished 6th on the Order of Merit list, earning US$980,000 for the season. He had a total of six career wins on the Japan Tour between 1991 and 2003.

Murota won many tournaments all over Japan, including non-order of merit events and pro-ams all over Japan.

Murota has attempted to travel across the Pacific Ocean and play successfully on the PGA Tour, but that success was not found. In seven career PGA Tour events, his three  best finishes came in 1993 at the United Airlines Hawaiian Open (T66), at the 1994 Nissan Los Angeles Open (T20), and at the 1994 Bob Hope Chrysler Classic (T28).

Murota represented Japan in the 1992 World Cup.

Since turning 50, Murota has played on the Japan Senior PGA Tour and the United States-based Champions Tour. Most notably, he won the Japan PGA Senior Championship in 2005, 2009, 2012, and 2015. He won the Order of Merit title in consecutive years on the Japan Senior PGA Tour in 2006 and 2007, winning an event in each of those years. In five events in 2006, he won two, and never finished outside of the top four in winning the Order of Merit. His second Order of Merit year was 2007, included one victory and four runner-up finishes. He has played in a few senior major championships also.

Professional wins (33)

Japan Golf Tour wins (6)

Japan Golf Tour playoff record (1–2)

Other wins (7)
1990 Mori Minato Cup
1991 KSD Charity
1992 Tochigi Open
1997 Pearl Open, Hirao Masaaki Pro-Am
1998 Toyamaken Open
2011 Legend Charity Pro-Am

Japan PGA Senior Tour wins (20)
2005 Japan PGA Senior Championship
2006 Aderans Wellness Open, Fancl Classic
2007 Fancl Classic
2009 Japan PGA Senior Championship
2010 Sakakibara Onsen GC Senior Open
2011 Japan Senior Open
2012 Japan PGA Senior Championship
2013 Kyoraku More Surprise Cup, Japan Senior Open, Iwasaki Shiratsuyu Senior Golf Tournament
2014 Fujifilm Senior Championship 
2015 Starts Senior Golf Tournament, Fancl Classic, Japan PGA Senior Championship
2016 Fancl Classic, Alfa Club Cup Senior Open
2017 Kyoraku More Surprise Cup, Alfa Club Cup Senior Open
2018 Kumamoto Aso Senior Open Golf Tournament

Team appearances
World Cup (representing Japan): 1992
Dynasty Cup (representing Japan): 2003

References

External links

Japanese male golfers
Japan Golf Tour golfers
PGA Tour Champions golfers
Sportspeople from Gunma Prefecture
1955 births
Living people
20th-century Japanese people